The Survivable Radio Network (SURAN) project was sponsored by DARPA in the 1980s to develop a set of mobile ad hoc network (MANET) radio-routers, then known as "packet radios". It was a follow-on to DARPA's earlier PRNET project. The program began in 1983 with the following goals:

 develop a small, low-cost, low-power radio that would support more sophisticated packet radio protocols than the DARPA Packet Radio project from the 1970s
 develop and demonstrate algorithms that could scale to tens of thousands of nodes
 develop and demonstrate techniques for robust and survivable packet networking in sophisticated electronic attacks.

A follow-on program in 1987, the Low-cost Packet Radio (LPR), attempted further innovations in mobile networking protocols, with design goals including:

 management of radio spreading codes for security, and increasing capacity
 new queue management and forwarding techniques for spread spectrum channels
 scalability based on dynamic clustering

BBN Technologies provided the MANET protocols, and Rockwell provided radio hardware. The prototype radios produced in these programs were known as VRC-99 radios, and were used by the Department of Defense throughout the 1990s for experimentation.

References

See also
 Survivable Low Frequency Communications System

Radio resource management